The 1996 San Diego State Aztecs football team represented San Diego State University during the 1996 NCAA Division I-A football season as a member of the Western Athletic Conference (WAC).

The team was led by head coach Ted Tollner, in his third year. They played home games at Jack Murphy Stadium in San Diego, California. They completed the season with a record of eight wins, three losses (8–3, 6–2 WAC).

Schedule

Team players in the NFL
The following were selected in the 1997 NFL Draft.

The following finished their college career in 1996, were not drafted, but played in the NFL.

Team awards

Notes

References

San Diego State
San Diego State Aztecs football seasons
San Diego State Aztecs football